The 2013 season was the Carolina Panthers' 19th in the National Football League and their third under head coach Ron Rivera. NFL.com ranked the Panthers' schedule as the strongest in the league, with opponents having a combined 2012 record of 138–116–2 and a winning percentage of .543.

After starting the season 1–3, the Panthers went 11–1 the rest of the way, including a then-record eight-game winning streak, securing their first winning season and playoff appearance since 2008, the first winning season under Rivera and the fifth in franchise history. During Week 12, they defeated the Miami Dolphins, also a franchise first for the Panthers. They also notched their third NFC South title, their first since 2008 and their fourth division title overall. This was the first of three consecutive NFC South titles for the Panthers. Their season ended in the Divisional round of the playoffs with a 23–10 loss to the San Francisco 49ers.

Draft

Note: The Panthers did not have selections in the third or seventh rounds. The team traded its third-round selection (74th overall) and a 2012 sixth-round selection to the San Francisco 49ers in exchange for the 49ers' 2012 fourth-round selection, as well as its seventh-round selection (219th overall) to the Oakland Raiders in exchange for wide receiver Louis Murphy.

Staff

Final roster

Schedule

Preseason

Regular season

Note: Intra-division opponents are in bold text.

Game summaries

Regular season

Week 1: vs. Seattle Seahawks

The Panthers opened up the regular season at home in an NFC battle with the Seattle Seahawks. Seattle got on the board first with Steven Hauschka hitting a 27-yard field goal in the second quarter. The Panthers gained the lead when quarterback Cam Newton made a 3-yard touchdown pass to wide receiver Steve Smith with 3:13 left in the first half. The Seahawks cut the Panthers lead to one point when Hauschka put through a 40-yard field goal in the third quarter. The Seahawks continued to dominate the second half when quarterback Russell Wilson threw a 43-yard touchdown pass to wide receiver Jermaine Kearse in the fourth quarter with 10:13 remaining in the game. The Panthers were on the verge of scoring, however running back DeAngelo Williams fumbled the ball at the Seattle 8-yard line with 5:25 left in the game and the Seahawks recovered. Seattle went on to run out the rest of the clock and go to 1–0 while the Panthers fell to 0–1 for the fifth consecutive year. Also, the team dropped to 10–4 when Newton does not have a turnover.

Week 2: at Buffalo Bills

The Panthers came into Buffalo looking to recover from a close loss in Seattle the previous week. In the third quarter Cam Newton bombed a 40-yard touchdown pass to Ted Ginn, giving the Panthers a 14–6 lead. Fred Jackson then ran in a 4-yard touchdown to put the Bills behind 14–12. The Bills converted the two-point conversion, putting the score at 14–14. The Panthers stalled twice in the red zone, forcing them to kick field goals to make the score 20–14. After a Dan Carpenter 48-yard kick, the Panthers got the ball back, marched down the field, but were stuffed on 4th and 1 at the Bills' 22. The Panthers decided to kick the field goal to put them up 23–17. EJ Manuel and the Bills got the ball back and march down the field. With 20 seconds remaining in the game from the Panthers' 31, Manuel threw an interception, but it was called back due to Luke Kuechly, the linebacker, committing pass interference. With 2 seconds remaining from the Panthers' 2-yard line, Manuel hit wide receiver Stevie Johnson in the back of the end zone for the score. With the loss, the Panthers fell to 0–2, and 3–17 when Newton had at least a turnover.

Week 3: vs. New York Giants

At 0–2, the Panthers came onto their home turf desperate for a win. The Panthers romped the Giants (0–3) 38–0 behind seven defensive sacks and the flashy play of offensive weapons like Cam Newton and DeAngelo Williams. This was the largest margin of victory in Panthers history and this gave Giants' head coach Tom Coughlin his largest margin of defeat in his history of coaching the Giants. With the win, the Panthers increased to 1–2 and 4–17 when Newton turns the ball over.

Week 5: at Arizona Cardinals

With the loss, the Panthers dropped to 1–3. The team also dropped to 4–18 when Newton turns the ball over.

Week 6: at Minnesota Vikings

With the win, the Panthers improved to 2–3 and also 11–4 in games where Newton does not commit a turnover.

Week 7: vs. St. Louis Rams

With the win, the Panthers improved to 3–3 and 12–4 when Newton doesn't have a turnover.

Week 8: at Tampa Bay Buccaneers

With the win, the Panthers improved to 4–3, and 13–4 when Newton does not turn the ball over.

Week 9: vs. Atlanta Falcons

For the first time in franchise history the Panthers scored 30 or more points in four consecutive games, routing NFC South rival Atlanta Falcons 34–10. With the win, Carolina increased to a 5–3 record. The team also improved to 5–18 when Newton turns the ball over.

Week 10: at San Francisco 49ers

Putting two of the NFL's best defenses against each other, the game indeed proved to be a defensive battle. The reigning NFC champions San Francisco, coming off a bye, only managed three field goals, partly due to the absence of start wide receiver Michael Crabtree and an early injury to tight end Vernon Davis. The 49ers received the opening kickoff and drove to the Carolina 33, where, on 3rd-and-2, Frank Gore was tackled for a 1-yard loss. Phil Dawson kicked a 52-yard field goal for the early 3–0 lead. Punts filled the rest of the quarter, with less than a minute left in the first quarter, Drayton Florence muffed the punt with Eric Reid recovering for San Francisco. The 49ers converted that into a 43-yard field goal for a 6–0 lead. After both teams swapped punts, Cam Newton was intercepted by Tramaine Brock at the 49ers 35 who returned it 41 yards to the Panthers 24. The 49ers drove to the Panthers 7 and Dawson kicked his third field goal, connecting from 25 yards. The Panthers finally responded on their next drive, storming 80 yards in just 8 plays with DeAngelo Williams bursting through for a 27-yard touchdown run, trimming the score to 9–7 at halftime. On the Panthers second drive of half they drove, 59 yards taking 5:44 off the clock, but Graham Gano missed a 48-yard field goal. The 49ers responded by driving to the Panthers 39, but Kendall Hunter was stripped by linebacker Thomas Davis and Quintin Mikell recovered for Carolina. After both teams swapped punts again, Gano drilled a 53-yard field goal for a 10–9 Panthers lead, their first of the game. After both teams punted on their next two drives, Drayton Florence made up for his earlier mistake with an interception with 0:37 left to seal the 10–9 Carolina statement victory. The Panthers snapped the 49ers' five-game winning streak, extended their own winning streak to five, and further increased their record to 6–3. Also, the team's record when Newton commits at least one turnover increased to 6–18.

Week 11: vs. New England Patriots

With Monday Night Football back in Charlotte for the first time since 2008, it pitted the Panthers against the 7–2 New England Patriots, who were coming back from a bye. Down 17–20 with less than a minute left, Panthers quarterback Cam Newton threw a 25-yard touchdown to wide receiver Ted Ginn Jr., bringing Carolina up 24–20. The Patriots received the ball back, and with only three seconds remaining, Patriots quarterback Tom Brady was intercepted by Panthers safety Robert Lester in the endzone. However, a flag was thrown by back judge Terrence Miles just after the ball was intercepted because Patriots tight end Rob Gronkowski, the intended target, was wrapped up by Panthers linebacker Luke Kuechly. The officials initially called pass interference on Kuechly. With no time left, this would have resulted in an untimed first-and-goal from the one-yard line. However, after the officials talked it over, they picked up the flag and ruled that the pass was uncatchable due to it being underthrown, and the game ended in a Panthers win. The prime time victory, before one of the largest crowds in franchise and Bank of America Stadium history, extended the Panthers' winning streak to six, increased their record to 7–3 and improved to 14–4 when Newton does not turn the ball over.
Both teams ended the game with identical records of 7–3.

Week 12: at Miami Dolphins

For the first time during the season, the Panthers allowed a touchdown drive in the first quarter, and were down 16–6 at halftime to the 5–5 Miami Dolphins. However, Carolina came back in the second half and ultimately held the Dolphins scoreless. Trailing 13–16 with two minutes remaining, quarterback Cam Newton converted a fourth-and-10 from the Panthers' own 20 with a completion to wide receiver Steve Smith, and a touchdown pass to tight end Greg Olsen with 43 seconds left won the game for the Panthers, 20–16. Carolina extended their winning streak to seven (tying the franchise record), extended their record to 8–3 and also improved 7–18 when Newton turns the ball over. It was also the first time in their franchise history the Panthers defeated the Dolphins.

Week 13: vs. Tampa Bay Buccaneers

With the win, the Panthers broke their franchise record winning their 8th straight game improving to 9–3 in the process giving the team their first winning season since 2008 and also improving to 8–18 when Newton turns the ball over.

Week 14: at New Orleans Saints

With the loss, the Panthers fell to 2nd place in the NFC South sitting at 9–4 as they also dropped to 14–5 when Newton doesn't turn the ball over.

Week 15: vs. New York Jets

With the win, the Panthers improved to 10–4 and also came out to 15–5 when Newton doesn't turn the ball over.

Week 16: vs. New Orleans Saints

The Panthers came into the game hoping to avenge their loss to the Saints two weeks prior, with the winner taking first place in the NFC South. In the second quarter, a strong rain blanketed the stadium, reminiscent of a similar storm in 2011 against Jacksonville. New Orleans scored late to go up 13–10 with less than two minutes to play. Cam Newton led the offense down the field and into the red zone on the following possession. With under a minute to play, Newton threw the game-winning touchdown pass to receiver Domenik Hixon, who was replacing an injured Steve Smith. It was later reported the stadium's press box shook when Hixon caught the touchdown. Carolina's defense was able to prevent the Saints from completing a last-second Hail Mary. With the win, the Panthers clinched a playoff spot and improved to 11–4. The team also improved to 9–18 when Newton turns the ball over.

Week 17: at Atlanta Falcons

Despite sacking Matt Ryan nine times—a single-game franchise record—the Panthers were not assured of a win until the final seconds. With 31 seconds to go and trailing 21–20, the Falcons were driving in hopes of setting up a game-winning field goal. However, center Joe Hawley snapped the ball before Ryan was ready. The ball sailed back 16 yards to the Atlanta 27. Hawley later said that he was distracted by the noise from a large number of Panther fans who made the five-hour drive to Atlanta, and thought Ryan was calling for the ball. With the win, the Panthers clinched the NFC South, the #2 seed and a first-round bye, finishing 12–4 in the progress while going 10–18 when Newton turned the ball over. They swept the Falcons for the first time since 2005.

Standings

Division

Conference

Postseason

NFC Divisional Playoff Game: vs. #5 San Francisco 49ers 

The Panthers played at home against the #5 seed 49ers. The 49ers led for most of the game and eventually won, ending the Panthers' season and dropping them to a 12–5 total. Also, Cam Newton went 0–1 as a starter for the Panthers in the playoffs while the team went 10–19 when he turned the ball over.

References

External links
 
 

Carolina
Carolina Panthers seasons
NFC South championship seasons
Carolina